Pa Alam Rural District is a rural district (dehestan) in the Central District of Pol-e Dokhtar County, Lorestan Province, Iran. At the 2006 census, its population was 5,368, in 1,118 families.  The rural district has 30 villages.

References 

Rural Districts of Lorestan Province
Pol-e Dokhtar County